Oman may refer to:

Places
 Oman, an Arab country in the Middle East
 Muscat and Oman, predecessor sultanate (1820-1970) 
 Oman proper, historical region of, and previous imamate within, modern Oman
 Trucial Oman or Trucial States, predecessor to the United Arab Emirates and adjacent to Oman

People
Carola Oman (1897–1978), English historian and author
Charles Oman (1860–1946), British military historian
Charles P. Oman (born 1948), American economist
Ed Oman (b. 1930), former Canadian politician
Joseph Wallace Oman (1864–1941), Rear Admiral in the United States Navy
Ken Oman (b. 1982), Irish footballer
Nathan Oman (b. 1975), legal scholar and educator
Paul W. Oman (1908-1996), entomologist
Ralph Oman (b. 1940), American military officer

Other
Oman (fish), a genus of fish in the family Blenniidae
Oman bullhead shark, shark
Oman LNG, liquefied natural gas plant in Oman

See also

Omen (disambiguation)
Omin
Omon (disambiguation)